Gerry Barr is the 1996 recipient of the Pearson Medal of Peace for the creation of the Steelworkers Humanity Fund. He is currently the National Executive Director and CEO of the Directors Guild of Canada.

External links
 Pearson Medal of Peace - Gerry Barr

References

21st-century Canadian philanthropists
Year of birth missing (living people)
Living people
Place of birth missing (living people)
20th-century Canadian philanthropists